Devlins Creek, an urban watercourse that is part of the Parramatta River catchment, is located in Northern Suburbs region of Sydney, Australia.

Course and features

Devlins Creek is transversed by the Cumberland Highway, the M2 Hills Motorway, the Beecroft Road, and the Main North railway line. A bridge over the Devlins Creek, constructed in 1935, is listed on the New South Wales Heritage Register. 

Devlins Creek, or sometimes recorded incorrectly as Devlin's Creek, is named in honour of James Devlin (1807–1875), a wealthy landowner and trustee of the Field of Mars Common.

See also 

 Great North Walk
 Great North Road
 Lane Cove National Park
 Rivers of New South Wales

References 

Creeks and canals of Sydney
Lane Cove River
Hornsby Shire
City of Parramatta